Bozhdovo is a village in Sandanski Municipality, in Blagoevgrad Province, Bulgaria. Some Aromanian nomadic families settled here in the 19th century.

References

Villages in Blagoevgrad Province
Aromanian settlements in Bulgaria